Gum Tayeng is an Indian politician.

Early life
In 1962 she passed Pre-University College at Lady Keane College in Shillong. Afterwards she worked as a school teacher for some time.

On October 18, 2013 she was elected unopposed to the Arunachal Pradesh Legislative Assembly as an Indian National Congress candidate in a by-election in the  Dambuk constituency. She is the widow of Jomin Tayeng, who had been elected to the Dambuk seat in the 2009 election.

Gum Tayeng was fielded as the Congress candidate in Dambuk in the 2014 Legislative Assembly election. She was one of only six women in the state to stand as candidate.

References

Year of birth missing (living people)
Living people
People's Party of Arunachal politicians
Indian National Congress politicians from Arunachal Pradesh
Women members of the Arunachal Pradesh Legislative Assembly
People from Lower Dibang Valley district
21st-century Indian women politicians
21st-century Indian politicians
Indian schoolteachers
Women educators from Arunachal Pradesh
Educators from Arunachal Pradesh
20th-century Indian educators
20th-century women educators
Arunachal Pradesh MLAs 2009–2014
Arunachal Pradesh MLAs 2014–2019
Arunachal Pradesh MLAs 2019–2024
Bharatiya Janata Party politicians from Arunachal Pradesh